KKEA (1420 AM) is a radio station located in Honolulu, Hawaii.  The station was formerly owned by Cox Radio and offers the ESPN Radio sports talk format, broadcasting at 1420 kHz with ERP of 5 kW. The station is currently owned and operated by Blow Up LLC and was marketed as ESPN 1420 before rebranding as ESPN Honolulu as of February 25, 2019. It also transmits on Oceanic Spectrum  digital channel 884 for the entire state of Hawaii.

History
Prior to its flip to sports in 2003, KKEA was originally KCCN and had offered a Hawaiian format. Cox would later move the format over to sister station KKNE after they acquired the station. On February 25, 2019, KKEA added an FM translator -  (K224FR), rebroadcasting at 92.7. They also rebranded to ESPN Honolulu on the same day.

Programs
The Bobby Curran Show, The Sports Animals, The Josh Pacheco Show, On Point With Artie Wilson, and The Sports Cards and Collectibles Show.

The station is the radio partner of University of Hawaii sports. The radio station also features select games from the Interscholastic League of Honolulu (ILH) at the high school level. 

The station is affiliated with the San Francisco 49ers, San Francisco Giants, New York Yankees, Golden State Warriors and Los Angeles Rams radio networks.

More recently, ESPN Honolulu has produced more shows like Call the Coach with select University of Hawaii Coaches, Hawaii Football Now featuring Jordan Helle and Hunter Hughes, and Fan Friday with Dave Kawada and a guest UH athlete.

References

External links
FCC History Cards for KKEA
ESPN Honolulu official website

KEA
Sports radio stations in the United States
Radio stations established in 1966
1966 establishments in Hawaii